Racha Mohammad Yaghi (born 10 June 2002) is a Lebanese footballer who plays as a goalkeeper for Cypriot club Geroskipou and the Lebanon national team

Club career
Yaghi joined Safa in 2019; she kept four clean sheets in eight games in the 2019–20 season. She moved to Geroskipou in Cyprus in September 2022 for one season.

International career 
Yaghi was called up to represent Lebanon at the 2022 WAFF Women's Championship, helping her side finish runners-up.

Honours 
Safa
 WAFF Women's Clubs Championship: 2022
 Lebanese Women's Football League: 2020–21

Lebanon U18
 WAFF U-18 Girls Championship: 2019

Lebanon
 WAFF Women's Championship runner-up: 2022; third place: 2019

See also
 List of Lebanon women's international footballers

References

External links

 
 
 

2002 births
Living people
People from Baalbek
Lebanese women's footballers
Women's association football goalkeepers
Akhaa Ahli Aley FC (women) players
Safa WFC players
Lebanese Women's Football League players
Lebanon women's youth international footballers
Lebanon women's international footballers
Lebanese expatriate women's footballers
Lebanese expatriate sportspeople in Cyprus
Expatriate women's footballers in Cyprus